Abraham Cornelius Benjamin (25 August 1897 – 19 October 1968) was an American philosopher of science who taught at University  of Chicago and University of Missouri.

A. C. Benjamin was born in Grand Rapids, Michigan. He attended the University of Michigan, graduating with a B.A. in 1920. Continuing there, he studied "the logical atomism of Bertrand Russell", submitted his thesis on the topic, graduating Ph.D. in 1924.

The University of Illinois employed him as assistant professor of philosophy from 1925 to 1932. He was awarded a Guggenheim Fellowship in 1930. Then University of Chicago employed him similarly  until 1945 when  he became department chairman in philosophy at University of Missouri.

While in Chicago he wrote three books, first positing a logical structure to science, then a beginning description of the philosophy of science, and a course on values, methods, and concepts. In 1950 he presented "a history of philosophical systems" for an anthology on philosophy of the sciences. He described operationalism in a book in 1955, and a decade later a consideration of sciences related to human values and technology.

Benjamin retired from the department chair in 1956 and from teaching in 1966. He died 19 October 1968 in Columbia, Missouri.

Works
 1936: The Logical Structure of Science
 1937: Introduction to the Philosophy of Science via Internet Archive
 1940: Methods, Values and Concepts course
 1950: "A History of Philosophical Systems"
 1955: Operationism via HathiTrust
 1965: Science, Technology and Human Values

References

 Irving Anellis (2005) "Abraham Cornelius Benjamin" in The Dictionary of Modern American Philosophers.
 A. Cornelius Benjamin at PhilPapers

1897 births
1968 deaths
Philosophers of science
University of Michigan alumni
University of Chicago faculty
University of Missouri faculty
Writers from Grand Rapids, Michigan
20th-century American philosophers